The triangular space (also known as the medial triangular space, upper triangular space, medial axillary space or foramen omotricipitale) is one of the three spaces found at the axillary space. The other two spaces are the quadrangular space and the triangular interval.

Boundaries
It has the following boundaries:
 Inferior: the superior border of the teres major;
 Lateral: the long head of the triceps;
 Superior: Teres minor or Subscapularis 
For the superior border, some sources list the teres minor, while others list the subscapularis.

Contents
It contains the scapular circumflex vessels.

Unlike the quadrangular space or the triangular interval, no major nerve passes through the triangular space.

See also
 Quadrangular space
 Triangular interval

References

External links
 Diagram at microsurgeon.org
 Photo at tufts.edu
 Description at ganfyd.org
 Photo at ithaca.edu

Upper limb anatomy